Rice v. Connolly (1966) is an English legal precedent holding that there is no strict, general legal duty to assist a police officer prior to any possible arrest or caution, with even basic police enquiries nor to accompany the officer to a requested location.

Background
Leonard Rice on 20 March 1965 would not give his forename, nor full address, nor accompany the officer to a requested place (here, immaterially, a police box). The police prosecuted him as such and magistrates, considering the statutory words "wilfully obstructs", convicted him.

He appealed against conviction: for such obstruction of a constable when in the execution of his duty (contrary to Police Act 1964 s. 51 (3)).

Appellate decision
It was held that "although every citizen had a moral or social duty to assist the police, there was no relevant legal duty to that effect in the circumstances of the present case, and the appellant had been entitled to decline to answer the questions put to him and (prior to his arrest) to accompany the police officer".

Citations

See also 
 Police and Criminal Evidence Act 1984

External links 
 Law report

Humberside Police did not exist in 1966, they were created in 1974.

English criminal case law
Law enforcement in England and Wales
1966 in case law
1966 in England
1966 in British law